Tabea Medert (born 16 June 1994) is a German sprint canoeist.

She won a medal at the 2019 ICF Canoe Sprint World Championships.

References

1994 births
Living people
German female canoeists
ICF Canoe Sprint World Championships medalists in kayak